Cienia Wielka  is a village in the administrative district of Gmina Błaszki, within Sieradz County, Łódź Voivodeship, in central Poland.

The village has a population of 151.

References

Cienia Wielka